Sabrish Menon (born January 18, 1995) is an Indian right-arm bowler who plays cricket for Gujarat.

References

External links
Mehul Patel - Wisden profile 
Mehul Patel - CricketArchive profile

Indian cricketers
Gujarat cricketers
1995 births
Living people
Gujarati people